Deadwyler is a surname. Notable people with the surname include:

Danielle Deadwyler, American actress (born 1982)
Leonard Deadwyler, who was a victim of a police shooting in Los Angeles

See also
Detwiler